The 1989 Japanese motorcycle Grand Prix was the first round of the 1989 Grand Prix motorcycle racing season. It took place on the weekend of 24 to 26 March 1989 at the Suzuka Circuit.

500 cc race report
Wayne Rainey gets the lead and opens a small gap in the first lap, with Kevin Schwantz moving into second to chase him down. Wayne Gardner and Freddie Spencer go off-track, but get back in the race, while Doohan has a mechanical and Pierfrancesco Chili crashes out.

Schwantz soon catches and passes Rainey at the chicane in a typical late-braking move that leaves Rainey without much room. Rainey, not wanting to let Schwantz through, almost hits Schwantz’ back wheel and loses a lot of time. Schwantz will repeat the chicane pass two more times. From about half-race on, Rainey and Schwantz get in an epic fight, seemingly incapable of wanting to let the other take the lead. Rainey is so committed to staying in front of Schwantz that he does a downhill wheelie on the approach to the hairpin; on this lap alone they swap the lead at least 5 times.

Last lap sees Rainey ahead on the straight, but Schwantz passes into Turn One and manages to hold the lead to the finish line. Crossing the line, Rainey’s arm-flailing betrays his fury, but he manages to extend a hand of congratulations as he comes alongside Schwantz on the cool-down lap. Lawson battles his way through a handful of riders to take 3rd.

Rainey says of the last lap: “I couldn’t see my pit board so I was watching the circuit’s own lap counter over the start line. That clicks down as the leaders go underneath it, but I didn’t realize that. I read L2. I was following Kevin and thinking: why’s he riding so wild when there’s still another lap left? He was being real aggressive, and I was sitting right on him, planning how the next lap I’d draught him on the back straight, then not let him pass me at the chicane. Then we came across the start-finish line and there was the checker. It really pissed me off. Towards the end of 1988 we’d started saying hello to one another. It wasn’t just the two of us anymore. Now our rivalry started to heat up again.”

500 cc classification

References

Japanese motorcycle Grand Prix
Japanese
Motorcycle
March 1989 sports events in Asia